Boldnesian (1963–1975) was an American Thoroughbred racehorse and sire.

Racing career
In early 1966 Boldnesian won the Santa Anita Derby. He was scheduled to run in the Kentucky Derby, but his racing career was cut short by an operation after bone chips were discovered following his win at Santa Anita Park.

Stud record
At stud, Boldnesian notably sired Canadian Horse Racing Hall of Fame inductee Bold Ruckus and Bold Reasoning who in turn sired the 1977 U.S. Triple Crown winner Seattle Slew.

Pedigree

References

1963 racehorse births
1975 racehorse deaths
Racehorses bred in Kentucky
Racehorses trained in the United States
Thoroughbred family 4-m